The House of Peoples of the Federation of Bosnia and Herzegovina is an upper house of the Parliament of the Federation of Bosnia and Herzegovina, the lower being the House of Representatives. Federal laws need to be passed by both houses.

The House of Peoples is composed out of 23 delegates from each of the constitutive nations of the Federation of Bosnia and Herzegovina Bosniaks, Croats and Serbs as well as eleven delegates of the minorities referred to as others. The House of Peoples has one chairman and two vice-chairmen.

In July 2017, the BiH Constitutional Court struck down provisions of the election law regulating the indirect election of delegates to the House of Peoples of the Federation of Bosnia and Herzegovina. The court had previously, in 2016, declared these provisions unconstitutional, and decided that the rules should be changed to ensure legitimate representation in the election of Bosniak, Croat and Serb members to the Federation House of Peoples.

On 2 October 2022, High Representative Christian Schmidt imposed constitutional and legal changes called Measures to improve Federation Functionality. This increased the number of delegates from each of the constituent nations from 17 to 23, and for others from 7 to 11, thus increasing the House of Peoples from 58 to 80 delegates.

Delegates 

Allocation of mandates upon the decision of the High Representative for Bosnia and Herzegovina from 2 October of 2022.

Current composition
Officially allocated seats (until 2022 Federation of Bosnia and Herzegovina general election official results).

 Six more mandates were awarded to the House of Peoples of the Parliament of the Federation of Bosnia and Herzegovina during the second round.

One seat for Bosniaks was relocated from West Herzegovina to Bosnian-Podrinje.

All seats for Croats are shared in the first round.

Two seats for Serbs were relocated from Una-Sana and Tuzla to Bosnian-Podrinje, Herzegovina-Neretva and Sarajevo.

Three seats for the others were relocated from Posavina, Zenica-Doboj, Bosnian-Podrinje, Central Bosnia, West Herzegovina and 10 to Tuzla, Zenica-Doboj and Sarajevo.

References

Politics of the Federation of Bosnia and Herzegovina
Bosnia and Herzogovina parliaments